These are the late night schedules for the four United States broadcast networks that offer programming during this time period, from September 1993 to August 1994. All times are Eastern or Pacific. Affiliates will fill non-network schedule with local, syndicated, or paid programming. Affiliates also have the option to preempt or delay network programming at their discretion.

Legend

Schedule

Monday-Friday

Saturday

By network

ABC

Returning series
ABC in Concert
ABC World News Now
ABC World News This Morning
Nightline

New series
ABC in Concert Country

CBS

Returning series
CBS Morning News
Crimetime After Primetime
Kids in the Hall
Up to the Minute

New series
Late Show with David Letterman

Not returning from 1992-93:
A Closer Score
CBS Late Night
Personals

FOX

Returning series
Comic Strip Live
Code 3 
In Living Color 
Tales from the Crypt  

New series
The Chevy Chase Show

NBC

Returning series
Friday Night Videos / Friday Night
Later
NBC News at Sunrise
NBC Nightside
Saturday Night Live
The Tonight Show with Jay Leno

New series
Late Night with Conan O'Brien

Not returning from 1992-93:
Late Night with David Letterman

United States late night network television schedules
1993 in American television
1994 in American television